Omar Hamenad (born 7 February 1969) is an Algerian former professional footballer who played as a goalkeeper. He played in 26 matches for the Algeria national team from 1994 to 1998. He was also named in Algeria's squad for the 1998 African Cup of Nations tournament.

References

External links
 

1969 births
Living people
Algerian footballers
Association football goalkeepers
Algeria international footballers
1998 African Cup of Nations players
21st-century Algerian people